Shekarbureh (. Azeri şəkərbura) is a sweet pastry, dating back to at least the Sassanid era. Originally, it was like a halva made from sugar and almonds. Its alternate names in Persian include Shekarborak, Shekarbora, Shekarpareh, Shekarbozeh  and Shekarpirah. In its different variations, the dessert is also common in Azerbaijan, Iran, and Turkey.

Versions 

In Anatolia this pastry is called Şekerpare in Turkish and is one of the popular desserts in the Turkish cuisine. Mainly prepared by baking some soft balls of almond based pastry dipped in thick lemon-flavored sugar syrup, şekerpare is pronounced “sheh-kehr-PAH-rih” in Turkish.

In the Republic of Azerbaijan it is called şəkərbura and is used as a dessert. 
It is a sweet pastry in half-moon shape, filled with ground almonds, hazelnuts, or walnuts, and sugar. Shekerbura, shorgoghal, and pakhlava are the iconic foods of Novruz holiday in Azerbaijan.

In Azerbaijan, it usually involves teamwork of relatives, friends and neighbors who congregate at someone's home to make this Nowruz delight. Like other pastries prepared for Nowruz, shekerbura also has a symbolic meaning which denotes the half-moon or flame of fire.

Name and meaning 
The name for this crescent-shaped pastry comes from Persian shekar bureh شکربوره. Shekar means sugar in Persian and Bureh is a word that goes back to the Middle Persian *Bōrak. This word ultimately goes back to the Proto-Indo-European root *bher- which meant "to carve, cut, split,". Turkic languages have borrowed this word from Persian. The name of another pastry, Borak (Börek) is also borrowed from the same Persian word.

Preparation 
The dough is made of wheat flour, butter, milk, egg yolks, cream, and yeast. The filling is prepared from peeled almond or fried nuts mixed with sugar powder. It also includes cardamom to flavor the pastry.

The dough is rolled and cut into small round shapes, then filled with stuffing and closed up by making a pattern of stitches. The stitching pattern on the dough is produced using traditional tweezers called .

See also
Şekerpare
Revani

References

Iranian desserts
Turkish desserts
Azerbaijani desserts

Nut dishes